Alain Kaluyituka (born 2 January 1987) is a DR Congo professional footballer who plays as a forward. He has represented his country Congo DR 30 times, scoring 9 times. He has also represented his former club TP Mazembe in International football in both CAF Champions League and the FIFA Club World Cup.

Club career
Dioko was born in Kinshasa and in 2004 was signed to Linafoot club AS Vita Club for whom he played for 2 years. He would then transfer to TP Mazembe in 2007, where he would immediately find success. He played for the club in the 2007 CAF Champions League in which they reached the final 16 qualification, before being knocked out by FAR Rabat. During the 2008 CAF Champions League he played for the club, but they were knocked out of Group B, finishing third overall. 
Their ultimate success came during the 2009 CAF Champions League, which Mazembe won. Dioko received the Golden Boot, having scored 8 goals. This meant that for the first time ever TP Mazembe qualified for the 2009 FIFA Club World Cup. Dioko was part of the squad that participated in the FIFA Club World Cup, where they found limited success, finishing 6th of 7.

He scored the second goal in the semifinal of the 2010 FIFA Club World Cup, where TP Mazembe defeated Internacional of Brazil 2-0 to become the first team outside Europe and South America to reach the FIFA Club World Cup final. He was awarded the Silver Ball at the tournament.

In 2011, Dioko signed a three-year deal with Al-Ahly Doha in Qatar, wearing the No.15 jersey that he already had in Mazembe. While finalizing the transfer, a dispute erupted between Mazembe and Al Ahly. FIFA ruled in favour of Al Ahly and declared the player eligible to play in the Qatar Stars League.

In July 2012, Dioko was loaned from relegated Al Ahly to Al Kharaitiyat on a season-long deal. He transferred to Al Gharafa in July 2015.

International career
Dioko has represented DR Congo national football team 10 times, scoring 3 times. All of these matches were during the 2006 FIFA World Cup Qualifying.

Career statistics

Club Carrer Stats

International career Stats

Scores and results list DR Congo's goal tally first.

Honours
TP Mazembe
 Linafoot: 2009
 CAF Champions League: 2009, 2010
 2010 FIFA Club World Cup: Runner's up

Individual
 FIFA Club World Cup silver ball: 2010
 Qatar Stars League top goalscorer: 2013–14
 Qatar Stars League player of the month: November 2014

References

1987 births
Living people
2011 African Nations Championship players
Democratic Republic of the Congo footballers
Democratic Republic of the Congo international footballers
Democratic Republic of the Congo expatriate footballers
Expatriate footballers in Qatar
Footballers from Kinshasa
TP Mazembe players
Qatar Stars League players
Al Ahli SC (Doha) players
Al Kharaitiyat SC players
Al-Gharafa SC players
Lekhwiya SC players
Muaither SC players
2013 Africa Cup of Nations players
Association football forwards
21st-century Democratic Republic of the Congo people
Democratic Republic of the Congo A' international footballers
2009 African Nations Championship players
Democratic Republic of the Congo expatriate sportspeople in Qatar